Ulu Vaomalo Kini is a Samoan politician and former Cabinet Minister. He is a member of the Human Rights Protection Party.

He was first elected to the Legislative Assembly of Samoa in a by-election in 2000. He was re-elected at the 2001 election and appointed Minister of Sports, Youth and Culture. In August 2003 he was made Samoa's first Minister of Police in a Cabinet reshuffle. He lost his seat at the 2006 election.

In December 2015 he was arrested and charged with one count of intentional damage after using an excavator to uproot crops and trees during a family land dispute. He was convicted in July 2016.

References

Members of the Legislative Assembly of Samoa
Government ministers of Samoa
Human Rights Protection Party politicians
Living people
Year of birth missing (living people)